Jan Těsnohlídek (* April 11, 1987, Havlíčkův Brod, Czechoslovakia) is a Czech poet, writer, editor and publisher. He lived in Prague, Krucemburk and Krakow.

Life 
After K. V. Raise grammar school in Hlinsko he had many jobs - worked in bookstores, coffee shops, construction sites as a bricklayer, electrician, in galleries, in a fast-food restaurant, in the notary and attorney's office, etc. After he moved to Prague he briefly studied library studies and information studies at the Faculty of Arts of Charles University in Prague. Since 2008 to 2011 he has been editor and deputy editor of the magazine for contemporary poetry Psí víno. In 2009 he founded with Petr Štengl publishing house called Petr Štengl, and in 2011 he established his own publishing house JT's. His poems have been translated into English, German, Italian, Finnish, Slovenian, Spain, Dutch and Polish, and printed in Czech and foreign journals and anthologies. He cooperated with music bands Umakart and Lesní zvěř. Since 2009 he started organize and since 2011 he is an appointed judge of the literary competition for young poets called Competition Ortenova Kutná Hora. he is the youngest member of Czech PEN Club. Since 2012 to 2016 he lived in Krakow, Poland.

Awards 
The author was awarded in a number of literary competitions for young writers (among other Ortenova Kutna Hora 2005-2008, Hořovice Václava Hraběte 2006, 2008). His poems was included in the book Best Czech Poems 2009 and 2013 (Host 2009, 2013). For his debut collection of poems Násilí bez předsudků (Violence without prejudices) acquired Jiří Orten Book Prize. In 2010 he received one-month-long scholarship in Jyväskylä, Finland. He also received scholarships in Krakow, Poland (2012) and in Prague, Czech republic (2016) from Visegrad fund.

Work 
 Violence without prejudice (Násilí bez předsudků), Psí víno Publishing, 2009,  - a collection of poems
 Violence without prejudice (Násilí bez předsudků), 2nd edition, Petr Štengl Publishing, 2009,  - a collection of poems
 Cancer(Rakovina), JT's Publishing, 2011,  - a collection of poems
 ADA, JT's Publishing, 2012,  - novel
 Still something left to lose(Ještě je co ztratit), JT's Publishing, 2013,  - a collection of poems 
 Violence without prejudice (Násilí bez předsudků), 3rd edition, JT's Publishing, 2016,  - a collection of poems
 Save yourself first (Hlavně zachraň sebe), JT's Publishing, 2016,  - a collection of poems
 Poems 2005 - 2013 (Básně 2005 - 2013), Nakladatelství Knihovna Polička, 2017,  - collected poems, contains 4th edition of Violence without prejudice, 2nd edition of Cancer and 2nd edition of Still something left to lose

References

External Links 

 Interview in Literarni noviny: https://web.archive.org/web/20101229192707/http://www.literarky.cz/rozhovory/2617-koupit-bryle-a-poplatit-dluhy
 Profile on Portálu české literatury
 Author's blog http://tesnohlidek.blogspot.com/
 More info http://jteees.blogspot.com/
Additional site https://www.fastmoviedownload.in

Living people
Czech poets
Czech male poets
1987 births
Charles University alumni